Thomas Leo Crowe (3 October 1880 – 3 August 1914) was an Australian rules footballer who played with St Kilda in the Victorian Football League (VFL).

References

External links 

1880 births
1914 deaths
Australian rules footballers from Melbourne
St Kilda Football Club players
People from Carlton, Victoria